Jefferson County Government Center–Golden station (sometimes stylized and abbreviated as JeffCo Gov't Cntr•Golden) is an at-grade light rail station on the W Line of the RTD Rail system. It is located near the intersection of 6th Avenue and Johnson Road, on grounds of the Jefferson County Government Center in Golden, Colorado, after which the station is named.

The station opened on April 26, 2013, as the western terminus of the West Corridor, built as part of the Regional Transportation District (RTD) FasTracks public transportation expansion plan and voter-approved sales tax increase for the Denver metropolitan area.

Jefferson County Government Center–Golden station has a 705 space park and ride garage and a bus stop served by the Golden FlexRide, a demand-responsive transport service operated by RTD Bus, serving the city of Golden. The station also has bicycle parking racks, lockers and a connection to the 6th Avenue Trail, a multi-use trail that runs along U.S. Route 6.

References 

Golden, Colorado
RTD light rail stations
W Line (RTD)
Railway stations in the United States opened in 2013
2013 establishments in Colorado